Pavel Mikhailovich Sorin (born 12 March 1995 in Pskov) is a Russian rower. He won the gold medal in the quadruple sculls at the 2015 European Rowing Championships.  He was removed from the squad for the 2020 Olympics after failing a drugs test.

References

External links

1995 births
Living people
Russian male rowers
European Rowing Championships medalists
Sportspeople from Pskov